Thiosulfonates are organosulfur compounds with the formula RSO2SR'. Thiosulfonate esters are produced by oxidation of disulfides or by the reaction or organosulfonyl halides with thiolates.

Alkali metal thiosulfonates are the conjugate base of thiosulfuric acid. They are prepared by the reaction of organosulfonyl chlorides with sources of sulfide.

See also
Bunte salts are related organosulfur compounds with the formula RSSO3−
Thiosulfinate a structurally analogous functional group in a lower oxidation state, with the formula RSS(O)R

References

Organosulfur compounds